The boxing events of the 1967 Mediterranean Games were held in Tunis, Tunisia.

Medalists

Medal table

References
1967 Mediterranean Games report at the International Committee of Mediterranean Games (CIJM) website
1967 Mediterranean Games boxing tournament at Amateur Boxing Results

Medi
Sports at the 1967 Mediterranean Games
1967